This is a list of the counties and boroughs of the Unreformed House of Commons

In the following tables, the size of the electorate is shown as it was estimated to be in about 1800. These figures are estimates only, particularly in seats which were rarely contested.
In England, Scotland and Wales, there were 29 general elections between 1700 and the Reform Act of 1832. In Ireland, there were 11 elections between the Act of Union in 1801 and 1832. The figure under "Times contested" is the number of general elections at which the seat was contested during these periods. By-elections are not counted.
The dominant families in the counties gradually changed over time. They are shown as they were around 1800.
Monmouthshire was an English county from its formation in 1536, although it is in most respects Welsh and was formally made part of Wales in 1974.

English counties

English boroughs

In alphabetical order by county

Welsh counties

Welsh boroughs

Scottish counties

Scottish burghs

Irish counties

Irish boroughs

University seats

References

Edward Porritt, The Unreformed House of Commons - Parliamentary representation before 1832 (Cambridge University Press, 1903 - Reprint: Augustus M. Kelley, 1963) - Volume I - England and Wales - Volume II - Scotland and Ireland
John Brooke, The House of Commons 1754-1790 (Oxford University Press, 1964)
John Cannon, Parliamentary Reform 1640-1832 (Cambridge University Press, 1973)
J.E. Neale, The Elizabethan House of Commons (Jonathan Cape, 1949)
R.G. Thorne, The House of Commons 1790-1820 (Volume II, Constituencies) (Secker and Warburg, 1986)

Constituencies of the Parliament of the United Kingdom (historic)
1800